Marko Mikulić (born 30 January 1994 in Croatia) is a Croatian footballer, who currently plays for Obreš Sveti Ilija.

Career
Mikulić had a spell at Austrian Regionalliga side FC Mauerwerk.

References

External links
 

1994 births
Living people
Footballers from Zagreb
Association football goalkeepers
Croatian footballers
GNK Dinamo Zagreb II players
NK Lokomotiva Zagreb players
NK Sesvete players
FC Mauerwerk players
NK Drava Ptuj (2004) players
Austrian Regionalliga players
Croatian expatriate footballers
Expatriate footballers in Austria
Croatian expatriate sportspeople in Austria
Expatriate footballers in Slovenia
Croatian expatriate sportspeople in Slovenia